This is a list of films that are based on Hasbro properties, both owned originally by Hasbro and properties the company has acquired over the years.

Animated films 
Theatrical films
 GoBots: Battle of the Rock Lords (1986)
 My Little Pony: The Movie (1986)
 The Transformers: The Movie (1986)
 G.I. Joe: The Movie (1987) (Planned for theatrical release)
 Pound Puppies and the Legend of Big Paw (1988)
 My Little Pony: The Movie (2017)
 Peppa Pig: The Golden Boots (2015) (British, theatrical)
 Peppa Pig: My First Cinema Experience (2017) (British, theatrical)
 My Little Pony: A New Generation (2021)
Direct-to-Video
 Inhumanoids: The Movie (1986)
 G.I. Joe: Spy Troops (2003)
 G.I. Joe: Valor vs. Venom (2004)
 G.I. Joe: Ninja Battles (2004)
 Tonka Tough Truck Adventures: The Biggest Show on Wheels! (2004)
 Action Man: Robot Atak (2004)
 Weebles: Welcome to Weebleville! (2005)
 Candy Land: The Great Lollipop Adventure (2005)
 Beyblade: Fierce Battle (2005)1
 Weebles: Sharing in the Fun! (2005)
 My Little Pony: A Very Minty Christmas (2005)
 Action Man: X Missions – The Movie (2005)
 My Little Pony: The Princess Promenade (2006)
 My Little Pony Crystal Princess: The Runaway Rainbow (2006)
 My Little Pony: A Very Pony Place (2007)
 My Little Pony: Twinkle Wish Adventure (2009)
 My Little Pony: Equestria Girls (2013)1
 My Little Pony: Equestria Girls – Rainbow Rocks (2014)1
 My Little Pony: Equestria Girls – Friendship Games (2015)1  

TV specials
 My Little Pony: Rescue at Midnight Castle (1984)
 My Little Pony: Escape from Catrina (1985)
 Star Fairies (1985)
 Furby Island (2005)
 Transformers Prime Beast Hunters: Predacons Rising (2013) 
 My Little Pony: Equestria Girls – Legend of Everfree (2016) (also streaming)
 My Little Pony: Equestria Girls – Magical Movie Night (US) / Tales of Canterlot High (UK) (2017)  
 My Little Pony: Equestria Girls – Forgotten Friendship (2018) 
 My Little Pony: Equestria Girls – Rollercoaster of Friendship (2018)
 My Little Pony: Best Gift Ever (2018)  
 My Little Pony: Equestria Girls – Spring Breakdown (2019)
 My Little Pony: Rainbow Roadtrip (2019)  
 My Little Pony: Equestria Girls – Sunset's Backstage Pass (2019)
 My Little Pony: Equestria Girls – Holidays Unwrapped (2019) 

1 : Limited theatrical release.

Animated shorts 
Direct-to-Video
 A Charming Birthday (2003)
 Dancing in the Clouds (2004)
 Friends are Never Far Away (2005)
 Greetings from Unicornia (2006)
 Pinkie Pie and the Ladybug Jamboree (2006)
 My Little Pony: Meet the Ponies (2008)
 Waiting for the Winter Wishes Festival (2009)

Theatrical
 Hanazuki: Full of Treasures short film (2017) (Double billed with My Little Pony: The Movie (2017)

Live-action films

Feature-length films

Live-action shorts

Upcoming films

Films announced/in development

See also 
 Allspark (company)
 List of Entertainment One television programs

References 

Hasbro
Films based on Hasbro toys
Hasbro